Belak is a Slavic surname. Notable people with the surname include:

 Ivan Belák (born 1978), Slovak football midfielder
 Karlo Belak (born 1991), Croatian football player
 Teja Belak (born 1994), Slovenian female artistic gymnast
 Wade Belak (1976–2011), Canadian ice hockey player

Slavic-language surnames